Tatyana Ponyayeva-Tretyakova (born December 13, 1946) is a former volleyball player for the USSR. Born in Moscow, she competed for the Soviet Union at the 1968 and 1972 Summer Olympics.

References

External links 
 

Living people
1946 births
Sportspeople from Moscow
Soviet women's volleyball players
Olympic volleyball players of the Soviet Union
Volleyball players at the 1968 Summer Olympics
Volleyball players at the 1972 Summer Olympics
Olympic gold medalists for the Soviet Union
Russian women's volleyball players
Olympic medalists in volleyball
Medalists at the 1972 Summer Olympics
Medalists at the 1968 Summer Olympics
Honoured Masters of Sport of the USSR